A rincón is a grass meadow.  The term is in wide use in English in the southwest United States, where it refers specifically to a sloping (usually steep) meadow on the south facing upper slopes of a forested mountain.  These characteristic high meadows are formed by the repeated freezing and thawing of snow accumulations on south facing slopes, creating a habitat not conducive to forest.  They are further maintained by a high frequency of low-intensity wildfire.  A notable example of a wildfire begun in a rincon, with catastrophic consequences, was the 2000 Cerro Grande Fire in New Mexico, United States.

See also
goat prairie
potrero

References

Spanish words and phrases